Tuva Depression is located among mountains of South Central Siberia — the Tannu-Ola Mountains, Eastern Sayans and Western Sayans, and the Altay Mountains region. It is part of a region with a combination of raised lands and depressions.

This Tuva Depression is within the Tuva Republic.

See also
Depression (geology)
Kuznetsk Depression
Minusinsk Depression
Geography of South-Central Siberia

References

External links
 Central Siberia

Depressions of Russia
Landforms of Tuva
Geology of Siberia
Geography of Central Asia